Annai is a 2000 Tamil language drama film directed by Manobala. The film stars Bhanupriya, Nassar and Baby Sadhika while Ramesh Khanna, Manobala, and Mayilswamy among others form an ensemble cast.  Music for the film was composed by Dhina and the film opened to mixed reviews in February 2000.

Plot
A wealthy widow named Kanagamahalakshmi (Bhanupriya), who loses her husband (Nassar) and unborn child in a car crash, opts to look after an orphan child for a period of one month every year. Her decision operates smoothly for a few years. However, when the child, Anjali (Baby Sadhika), returns to the house for a third year, problems begin to arise. She expresses her distaste at the various deficiencies of Kanagamahalakshmi's household, including her foster parent itself. How Anjali makes the members in the house behave properly forms the rest of the story.

Cast

 Bhanupriya as Kanagamahalakshmi
 Nassar as Kanagamahalakshmi's husband
 Baby Sadhika as Anjali
 Manobala as Moses
 Ramesh Khanna
 Mayilswamy
 Madhan Bob
 Halwa Vasu
 Balaji
 Chaplin Babu
 Mano
 Rajeswari

Production
The film was shot on a budget of 33 lakh rupees within 14 days.

Soundtrack
The music was composed by Dhina.

References

2000 films
2000s Tamil-language films
Indian drama films
2000 drama films
Films directed by Manobala